Waldburg-Scheer was a County ruled by the House of Waldburg, located in southeastern Baden-Württemberg, Germany. Waldburg-Scheer was a partition of Waldburg-Trauchburg, to which it was restored in 1764.

Counts of Waldburg-Scheer 
 Joseph William Eusebius, 1717–56
 Leopold Augustus, 1756–64

1612 establishments in the Holy Roman Empire